Moon Child is the fourth album led by American jazz vibraphonist Johnny Lytle which was recorded in 1962 for the Jazzland label.

Reception

The Allmusic site awarded the album 4 stars stating "Moon Child is a perfect example of how instrumental jazz can have commercial appeal without losing its integrity".

Track listing
All compositions by Johnny Lytle except as indicated
 "Moonchild" - 4:39
 "Work Song" (Nat Adderley) - 6:38
 "The Nearness of You" (Hoagy Carmichael, Ned Washington) - 4:28
 "The Moor Man" - 4:02
 "A Taste of Honey" (Bobby Scott, Ric Marlow) - 4:36
 "When My Dreamboat Comes Home" (Cliff Friend, Dave Franklin) - 4:32
 "Moonlight In Vermont" (John Blackburn, Karl Suessdorf) - 4:27
 "The House Of Winchester" - 4:19

Personnel 
Johnny Lytle - vibraphone  
Milton Harris - organ
Steve Cooper  - bass
William "Peppy" Hinnant - drums
Ray Barretto - congas

References 

1962 albums
Johnny Lytle albums
Jazzland Records (1960) albums
Albums produced by Orrin Keepnews